Michael Joseph Kelly (born September 6, 1992) is an American professional baseball pitcher in the Cleveland Guardians organization. He has played in Major League Baseball (MLB) for the Philadelphia Phillies.

Career

San Diego Padres
Kelly attended West Boca Raton Community High School in Boca Raton, Florida, and played for the school's baseball team as a pitcher. The San Diego Padres selected Kelly in the first round, with the 48th overall selection, of the 2011 MLB draft. He pitched for the Padres' organization through 2017, then became a free agent.

Baltimore Orioles
The Orioles signed him to a major league contract after the 2017 season. Kelly was designated for assignment on March 29, 2018. He cleared waivers and was outrighted to the Double-A Bowie Baysox.

Southern Maryland Blue Crabs
He elected free agency on November 2, 2018, and spent the 2019 season with the Southern Maryland Blue Crabs of the Atlantic League of Professional Baseball, an independent baseball league.

Philadelphia Phillies
Kelly signed a minor league contract with the Philadelphia Phillies before the 2022 season. He began the season with the Triple-A Lehigh Valley IronPigs. The Phillies promoted him to the major leagues on June 13. He was sent outright to Triple-A on July 14. On October 14, Kelly elected free agency.

Cleveland Guardians
On January 4, 2023, Kelly signed a minor league contract with the Cleveland Guardians. The deal includes an invitation to the Guardians' 2023 major league spring training camp.

References

External links

Living people
1992 births
People from Boynton Beach, Florida
Baseball players from Florida
Major League Baseball pitchers
Philadelphia Phillies players
Fort Wayne TinCaps players
Arizona League Padres players
Eugene Emeralds players
Lake Elsinore Storm players
San Antonio Missions players
El Paso Chihuahuas players
Bowie Baysox players
Norfolk Tides players
Southern Maryland Blue Crabs players
Corpus Christi Hooks players
Sugar Land Skeeters players
Lehigh Valley IronPigs players